Aetos (Aytos, Macedonian: Ајтос, Ajtos) is a village and a former municipality in Florina regional unit, West Macedonia, Greece. Since the 2011 local government reform it is part of the municipality Amyntaio, of which it is a municipal unit. The municipal unit has an area of 134.092 km2. It is 18 km southeast of Florina. In 2011 it had a population 2,952.

The village is first mentioned in an Ottoman defter of 1481, where it is described as a settlement of fifty-nine households which produced vines and walnuts.

Notable people
Evangelos Natsis

References

Populated places in Florina (regional unit)
Former municipalities in Western Macedonia
Amyntaio